Rosa Rey (born Isabel Mercedes Tárrago) was a Spanish actress and opera singer who worked in Hollywood from the 1930s through the 1960s.

Biography 
Rey was born in Madrid, Spain, as Isabel Tárrago; she was a descendant of notable lawyer and poet Torcuato Tárrago y Mateos. Rey worked as an opera singer before making her way onto the silver screen as a character actress. She was married to actor Martin Garralaga; they both worked at Fox in the 1930s. She died on April 7, 1969, in Los Angeles County, California.

Selected filmography 
 La buenaventura (1934)
 Grand Canary (1934)
 Tripping Through the Tropics (1934)
 Tres Amores (1934)
 El cantante de Napoles (1935)
 Julieta Buys a Son (1935)
 Rosa de Francia (1935)
 El crimen de media noche (1936)
 El capitan Tormenta (1936)
 Song of the Gringo (1936)
 Fiesta (1941)
 The Face of Marble (1946)
 Gilda (1946)
 Two Years Before the Mast (1946)
 Secret Beyond the Door... (1947)
 Secret of the Incas (1954)
 The Rose Tattoo (1955)
 The Bottom of the Bottle (1956)
 Lawman (1959 episode "The Outsider") as Mrs. Lebeau

References

External links
 
 
 
 

Spanish film actresses
1892 births
1969 deaths
20th-century Spanish women opera singers
Spanish expatriates in the United States